St Mark's Cathedral, Fianarantsoa is an Anglican cathedral in Fianarantsoa, Madagascar.  It is under the Anglican Diocese of Fianarantsoa.

The cathedral was dedicated on 29 April 2018. The founder Bishop of Fianarantsoa is the present (2018) incumbent The Rt Revd Gilbert Rateloson Rakotondravelo.

See also
 List of cathedrals in Madagascar

References

Anglican cathedrals in Madagascar
Churches completed in 2018
21st-century Anglican church buildings
21st-century churches in Madagascar